Oosterbroek may refer to:

People 
 Ken Oosterbroek (1963-1994), South African photojournalist

Places 
 Oosterbroek, Groningen, a former municipality in the Netherlands
 Oosterbroek, Drenthe, a mansion and a former hamlet in the Netherlands